Matthew Yu Chengcai (27 August 1917 - 18 March 2006) was a Chinese Catholic who became the Bishop of Haimen in China over objections from the Holy See.

He was a member of the 8th, 9th, 10th National Committee of the Chinese People's Political Consultative Conference.

Biography
Yu was born in Chongming District of Shanghai, on August 27, 1917, to a Catholic family. After high school, he entered the Sacred Heart Cathedral in Haimen and then studied theology at the Xuhui Catholic Church. He was ordained a priest in 1946. In August 1946 he was accepted to the Fu Jen Catholic University in Beijing, after university in 1950, he was assigned to the Xilei High School as its president. In August 1954 he worked in the Roman Catholic Diocese of Haimen. In November 1959 he had been made a bishop of the Diocese of Haimen without consent of the Pope and was excommunicated latae sententiae. He was among the bishops who became bishops without a papal mandate in the People's Republic of China 1958–1962.

Later, after the Cultural Revolution, the Holy See legitimized a number of the illegitimate bishops who were still alive, but Bishop Yu was not among them.

He died of illness on March 18, 2006.

See also
Christianity in Jiangsu

References

1917 births
People from Shanghai
2006 deaths
Catholic University of Peking alumni
20th-century Roman Catholic bishops in China